The Dick Volz Best US PhD Thesis in Robotics and Automation is a yearly award to recognize outstanding Ph.D. thesis in the field of robotics and automation at any research institution in the United States of America. It is awarded with a four years delay as it is based both on thesis quality as well as post-graduation impact, hence, the 2007 Dick Volz Best US PhD Thesis Award was awarded in 2011. Its European counterpart is the Georges Giralt PhD Award.

The award is named after Professor Emeritus Richard A. Volz. He was a former Texas A&M Department of Computer Science department head and the president of the IEEE Robotics and Automation Society in 2006-2007. To honor his outstanding research on robotics and control as well as his mentoring, the Dick Volz Best US PhD Thesis in Robotics and Automation was established.
The list of award recipients includes the following:

The award committee includes Seth A. Hutchinson (University of Illinois Urbana-Champaign), John M. Hollerbach (University of Utah), Vijay Kumar (University of Pennsylvania), Gaurav Sukhatme (University of Southern California), and Henrik I. Christensen (Georgia Tech).

See also

 List of engineering awards
 List of mechanical engineering awards

References 

Systems sciences awards
Mechanical engineering awards